Lost In Radioland is a play written by (actor/writer/director) Ryan Paul James and (actress) Denny Siegel. The show opened September 4, 2009 at Theatre 68, and later in July 2010 at The Palisades Theatre.
Lost In Radioland is a project that James had been working on for nearly five years. The original title was Night Stories. The show is produced by Ronnie Marmo, General Hospital.

Casts
The 2009 showing brought out stars: Anne Jeffreys, Robert Costanzo, Leo Rossi, Sean Hayes, Valerie Harper, Gavin MacLeod, and James Worthy.

The 2009 original cast:
Chuck Hoyes,
Melissa Disney,
Katy Jacoby,
Katie Zeiner,
Kim Kutner,
James Maderez,
Johnny Soto,
Bruce Barker,
Virginia Novello,
Jesse Mackey,
Joe Dalo,
James E. Welsh,
Clint Tauscher,
Ryan Paul James,
Shelly Hacco,
Kourtney Sontag,
Peter Newman,
Dan Bender,
Hailey Ellen Agnew,
Monica Quintanilla,
Jeff Post,
Denny Siegel.

2010 Cast:
Chuck Hoyes,
Melissa Disney,
Katy Jacoby,
Katie Zeiner,
Bruce Barker,
Jesse Mackey,
Joe Dalo,
James E. Welsh,
Clint Tauscher,
Dan Bender,
Jeff Post,
Denny Siegel,
Angela Pupello,
Jordon Krain,
Helaine Cira,
Jilon VanOver,
Mary Alton,
Susan Silvestri,
Ashley Adler,
Caroline Simone O’Brien,
Kim Hamilton.

Producer: Andrew Frew

Lighting/Sound: Matt Lonn

References

External links
 www.ryanpauljames.net

2009 plays